Suren Babayan (September 18, 1950 in Yerevan) is an Armenian Film Actor, Director and Screenwriter. Babayan was born in Yerevan in 1950. He graduated from the "Directing Department of Yerevan Fine Arts and Theatre Institute" in 1972 and from "Advanced Directing Courses" in Moscow in 1980. Since 1980, Babayan has worked for "Hayfilm Studeio" as a director.

Filmography

References

External links
Suren Babayan's fantastic realism and surrealism.

Armenian male film actors
Armenian film directors
Armenian screenwriters
1950 births
Living people
20th-century Armenian male actors
Male actors from Yerevan
Film people from Yerevan